The 2018 season of Atlético Petróleos de Luanda is the club's 37th season in the Girabola, the Angolan Premier football League and 37th consecutive season in the top flight of Angolan football. In 2018,  the club participated in the Girabola and the CAF Confederation Cup.

J.G.M. withdrawal
In late April, J.G.M. submitted a withdrawal request to the Angolan Football Federation citing financial reasons. The request was granted. As a result, 3 points won by Petro in its round 8 away match win against J.G.M. were withdrawn.

Squad information

Players

Pre-season transfers

Mid-season transfers

Staff

Overview

Angolan League

League table

Results

Results summary

Results by round

Results overview

Match Details

CAF Confederation Cup

Results summary

First round

Preliminary round

Season statistics

Appearances and goals

|-
! colspan="10" style="background:#DCDCDC; text-align:center" | Goalkeepers

|-
! colspan="10" style="background:#DCDCDC; text-align:center" | Defenders

|-
! colspan="10" style="background:#DCDCDC; text-align:center" | Midfielders

|-
! colspan="10" style="background:#DCDCDC; text-align:center" | Forwards

|-
! colspan="10" style="background:#DCDCDC; text-align:center" | Opponents

|-
! colspan="10" style="background:#DCDCDC; text-align:center" | Total
|- align=center
| colspan="4"|Total || 352(90) || 44 || 308(78) || 38 || 44(12) || 6
|}

Scorers

Clean sheets

See also
 List of Atlético Petróleos de Luanda players

External links
 PetroLuanda.co.ao Official club website 
 Match schedule
 Girabola.com profile
 Zerozero.pt profile
 Facebook profile

References

Atlético Petróleos de Luanda seasons
Petro de Luanda